The 1977 Volvo International was a men's tennis tournament played on outdoor clay courts in North Conway, New Hampshire in the United States and was part of the 1977 Colgate-Palmolive Grand Prix. The tournament began on July 31, 1977. Unseeded John Alexander won the singles title.

Finals

Singles

 John Alexander defeated  Manuel Orantes 2–6, 6–4, 6–4
 It was Alexander's 4th title of the year and the 23rd of his career.

Doubles

 Brian Gottfried /  Raúl Ramírez defeated  Fred McNair /  Sherwood Stewart 7–5, 6–3
 It was Gottfried's 8th title of the year and the 46th of his career. It was Ramírez's 7th title of the year and the 54th of his career.

References

External links
 ITF tournament edition details

 
Volvo International
Volvo International
Volvo International
Volvo International
Volvo International